Elsebeth Kock-Petersen (born 15 January 1949) is a Danish Venstre politician. Kock-Petersen was appointed the youngest ever Minister for Ecclesiastical Affairs in 1982 before being made Minister of Social Affairs between 1984 and 1986 and then the Minister of Health from 1988 to 1989. She was appointed Commander of the Order of the Dannebrog in 1984.

Early life and education
Kock-Petersen was born to the Nørrebro-based parish priest Ejnar Larsen and housewife Anna Maria Elkjær Larsen in Copenhagen on 15 January 1949. She was educated at Nørre Gymnasium from 1967 and graduated from the University of Copenhagen with a Candidate of Law in 1973.

Career
Aged 15, Kock-Petersen began her involvement in politics as a member of the Venstres Ungdom. She sat on the board of the Liberal Youth Board in Copenhagen-Frederiksberg between 1965 and 1970. Kock-Petersen also worked as a Sunday school teacher at Brorsons Kirke as well becoming a member of Nørrebro's Local Council between 1965 and 1973 and the City of Copenhagen's advisory youth committee from 1967 to 1973.

She went on to not get elected to represent the  constituency at the 1973 Danish general election. At the 1975 Danish general election on January 9, Kock-Petersen was elected to the Folketing as a representative of the  constituency caused by the Venstre party led by Prime Minister Poul Hartling gaining seats. She lost her seat the 1977 Danish general election on 15 February of that year when her party lost seats.

Kock-Petersen joined the Ministry of Justice's Marriage Committee between 1976 and 1983. At the age of 33, she was appointed Minister for Ecclesiastical Affairs under the first government of Poul Schlüter on 10 September 1982. Kock-Petersen was the youngest person to be appointed to that position of government. At the 1984 Danish general election on 10 January, she won re-election to the Folketing, this time as the representative of the  constituency. Kock-Petersen was appointed Minister for Social Affairs on 23 July 1984 after Schlüter reshuffled his cabinet and she declined to be made the  two years later because she was disinterested with it. Her former role as Minister for Ecclesisatical Affairs was assigned to Mette Madsen.

A cabinet reshuffle in 1986 saw Kock-Petersen removed as Minister for Social Affairs and she was appointed a member of the board for both The Mission among the Homeless and SJL Bank. When a new government was established in 1988, she accepted the offer to become the new Minister of Health and she began the role on 3 June 1988. Kock-Petersen resigned the post at her own request, and she left the post 7 December 1989 before resigning from the Folketing on 12 December 1990 to focus more time on her family. She and her two children secretly relocated to the United Kingdom and settled in Bedford, north of London and no longer makes any public appearances.

Personal life
She was married to the lawyer Nils K.-P. from 13 December 1970 until they divorced in the early 1990s. In 1984, Kock-Petersen was appointed Commander of the Order of the Dannebrog.

References

1949 births
Living people
Politicians from Copenhagen
20th-century Danish women politicians
21st-century Danish women
University of Copenhagen alumni
Members of the Folketing 1975–1977
Members of the Folketing 1984–1987
Members of the Folketing 1987–1988
Members of the Folketing 1988–1990
Women members of the Folketing
Women government ministers of Denmark
Danish Ministers for Ecclesiastical Affairs
Danish Health Ministers
Venstre (Denmark) politicians
Danish expatriates in England
Commanders of the Order of the Dannebrog